Kargah (also Romanized as Kārgāh) is a village in Rizab Rural District, Qatruyeh District, Neyriz County, Fars Province, Iran. At the 2006 census, its population was 442, in 95 families.

References 

Populated places in Neyriz County